The Usme Formation (Tsu, Teu) is a geological formation of the Bogotá savanna, Altiplano Cundiboyacense, Eastern Ranges of the Colombian Andes. The formation consists of a lower part with predominantly shales with intercalated sandstone beds and an upper sequence with sandstones and conglomerates.

Etymology 
The formation was defined by Hubach in 1957 and named after the locality of Usme, Bogotá.

Description

Lithologies 
The Usme Formation is subdivided into a lower sequence of shales with intercalated sandstones and an upper part of sandstones and conglomerates.

Stratigraphy and depositional environment 
The Usme Formation unconformably overlies the Regadera Formation and is overlain by the Tilatá Formation. The age has been estimated, based on palynological data, to be Late Eocene to Early Oligocene. The depositional environment has been interpreted as marine with the upper part deposited in a deltaic setting.

Outcrops 

The Usme Formation is found in its type locality in the synclinal of Usme, the valley of the Tunjuelo River.

Regional correlations

See also 

 Geology of the Eastern Hills
 Geology of the Ocetá Páramo
 Geology of the Altiplano Cundiboyacense

Notes and references

Notes

References

Bibliography

Maps

External links 
 

Geologic formations of Colombia
Paleogene Colombia
Eocene Series of South America
Oligocene Series of South America
Tinguirirican
Divisaderan
Lutetian Stage
Priabonian Stage
Rupelian Stage
Sandstone formations
Shale formations
Deltaic deposits
Formations
Formations
Formations
Muysccubun